Francis of Denmark (15 July 1497 – 1 April 1511), was a prince of Denmark, Norway and Sweden, the youngest son of King John of Denmark and Christina of Saxony. He died of the plague at the age of 13.

Ancestry

Sources

DENMARK, Medieval Lands

1497 births
1511 deaths
House of Oldenburg in Denmark
Danish princes
Swedish princes
Norwegian princes
Burials at St. Canute's Cathedral
16th-century deaths from plague (disease)
Sons of kings
Royal reburials
Royalty and nobility who died as children